Jhoan Manuel Arenas Delgado is a Colombian footballer who currently plays for Cúcuta Deportivo, after having played extensively in Colombia and Venezuela.

Career statistics

Club

References

1990 births
Living people
Colombian footballers
Colombian expatriate footballers
Association football midfielders
Venezuelan Primera División players
Kazakhstan Premier League players
FC Akzhayik players
Independiente Medellín footballers
Cúcuta Deportivo footballers
Deportivo La Guaira players
Zamora FC players
Estudiantes de Mérida players
Academia Puerto Cabello players
Atlético Venezuela C.F. players
Expatriate footballers in Venezuela
Expatriate footballers in Kazakhstan
Colombian expatriate sportspeople in Venezuela
Colombian expatriate sportspeople in Kazakhstan
People from Norte de Santander Department